(German for 'steps') is the sixth studio album by German band Silbermond. It was released on 15 November 2019 through . The album reached number one in Germany, becoming the band's third album to debut atop the German charts.

Background and composition
The band announced the album on 20 September 2019. The album title refers to the process of learning to walk, be it that of a small individual or of all humanity. The sound of the album was described as minimalistic and stripped-down. Lyrically, the band positions itself against xenophobia which alternates with lyrics regarding Kloß' and Stolle's parenthood as well as the loss of Kloß' father. With the album, the band intended to express their views on different issues without being condescending.

Critical reception

 received generally positive reviews. The German magazine Stern described the songs as poignant and catchy. The website Mix1 noted that the band dips increasingly more into Folk music and will not shy away from discussing social issues. In a negative review, Kevin Holtmann of  criticized the album for being "surface level" and that the band lacks edge or courage to "break free from their musical conventions".

Track listing
All song written by Thomas Stolle, Johannes Stolle, Andreas Nowak, and Stefanie Kloß.

Charts

Year-end charts

Release history

References

2019 albums
Silbermond albums
German-language albums